Nugegoda is a large, densely populated suburb of Colombo, Sri Lanka. It is located in the border of Sri Jayawardenapura Municipal Council limits and Dehiwela Mt. Lavinia Municipal Council limits, just outside Colombo city limits. It has a population of roughly over 250,000 people

Education 
Schools in the region include:

 Open University of Sri Lanka Nawala
 Anula Vidyalaya
 Lyceum International School
 Royal Institute International School
 Samudradevi Balika Vidyalaya
 St. John's College, Nugegoda
 St. Joseph's Boys' College, Nugegoda
 Sakya Academy
 Sujatha Vidyalaya

References

Populated places in Western Province, Sri Lanka